Eder is a surname. Notable people with the surname include:

Alfred Eder (born 1953), Austrian biathlete
Claudia Eder (born 1948), German singer
Elfi Eder (born 1970), Austrian alpine skier
Franz Xaver Eder (1925–2013), German Roman Catholic bishop
Hans Eder (1927-2008), Austrian Nordic skier
John Eder (born 1969), American politician
James Martin Eder (1838-1921), Colombian sugar industry pioneer
Josef Maria Eder (1855–1944), Austrian chemist specialized in the chemistry of photography
Linda Eder (born 1961), American singer and actress
Mari Eder (born 1987), Finnish biathlete and cross-country skier
Norbert Eder (1955–2019), German football player
Richard Eder (1932–2014), American critic
Simon Eder (born 1983), Austrian biathlete
Sylvia Eder (born 1965), Austrian alpine skier

See also
Éder (given name), Portuguese or Spanish given name

German-language surnames